The Company of the Gallows (original title: La Compagnia della Forca) is an Italian comic book series written and drawn by Magnus from 1977 to 1979 (with the collaboration of Giovanni Romanini).

Characters 

The Company of Monblanc (this is the real name of the company) is a seedy company of mercenaries led by Sir Percy of Montblanc, bumbling knight and young heir of Montblanc family. Other company members are:
 Capitan Golia, magister militum, warrior
 Annalisa of Montblanc, sister of Percy (and more skillful than him), archer
 Bertrando, minstrel and slinger (physically resembling Romanini)
 Messer Ciacco, sutler (and former executioner)
 Ser Crumb, squire of Sir Percy (with a physical resemblance with Magnus)
 Crusca, scullery-boy
The group is joined in some adventures by Doctor Nadir, a scholar of oriental sciences, with his friend King Frog (a frog), and Lattemiele, a cunning accountant.

Oscuro Signore ("Dark Lord"), driven by a prophecy, is trying to destroy the company using his minions. Among them, Crocca, a female vulture which starts the series telling company's story and the defeat of Evil.

Among the characters there are sages, corrupt monks, genies, dragons, dwarves, giants, fantasy and historical characters (York and Lancaster from the War of the Roses, Dracula).

Themes 
The story is an epic quest without its basic elements: the group, the aim, the battles, a clear separation between the good and the evil, a strong protagonist who decides what to do.

The style of Magnus pencils often retains funny and grotesque elements shown in Alan Ford.

The text, instead, is a mixture of sarcastic Max Bunker's style, Tolkien fantasy elements, medieval history, classical Northern European and Middle Eastern traditions and lore, and personal travels (for example, Magnus' travel to Croatia).

External links 
 UBC fumetti site page about the series  
 Page about the series on Enciclopedia del fumetto Slumberland 
 Site with Compagnia della forca  description 
 A pilot for a cartoon based on the series

Italian comics titles
1977 comics debuts
Italian comics
Comics characters introduced in 1977
1979 comics endings
Fantasy comics
Comics set in the Middle Ages